In Carnatic music, the Akshipthika is the first part or the introductory part of the alapana. It gives an idea about the raga (musical mode) in which the song is going to be sung. It is followed by the ragavardhini.
Akshipthika is the introduction  to the raagam. It usually starts on a low note in the scale but then again the artist is permitted to start wherever they want on the scale and at whatever tempo they want. We must remember that the idea raagam alapana is to allow the musician to creatively express themselves and the raagam without sticking to a particular scaffold as they must in a song. Thus, there is no particular order or manner in which it must be performed.

Carnatic music terminology